Bay of Pillars is a bay located in the Alexander Archipelago in the southeastern region of the U.S. state of Alaska. It is situated within the Kuiu Wilderness of the Tongass National Forest.

Geography
This bay is on the west side of Kuiu Island and opens on Chatham Strait, having Point Sullivan for the northern entrance point and Point Ellis marking the southern. It is a large body of water, much obstructed by islands and reefs, and has two deep arms similarly obstructed: North Bay of Pillars and South Bay of Pillars. The principal streams in this vicinity fished for commercial purposes are: Home Stream or Point Ellis Stream (the Indian name for it is Kutlakoo); Pillar Bay Stream; and Kuiu Stream (or Alecks Stream).

The North Bay of Pillars, like the South, is much obstructed by islets and reefs. It forms a harbor with anchorage in moderate depths.

It has a general north-and-south direction, flowing over a gravelly bottom between moderately steep banks heavily wooded. Tide water extends about  within the mouth.

References

Bibliography

Bays of Alaska
Tongass National Forest
Bodies of water of Petersburg Borough, Alaska